Mairead McKinley is a Northern Irish actress.

Career
Before starting her professional career, McKinley trained at the Royal Academy of Dramatic Art (RADA), where she won the Pauline Siddle Award.

Theatre
McKinley's work in theatre includes: Translations, Cyrano de Bergerac, Fair Ladies at a Game of Poem Cards and The Hour We Knew Nothing of Each Other at the National Theatre, London; Roberto Zucco, Shadows of the Glen, Riders to the Sea and Purgatory for the RSC; Ten Rounds and Further than the Furthest Thing (including tour) at the Tricycle Theatre, London; Macbeth and Don Juan at West Yorkshire Playhouse, Leeds; The Cherry Orchard for Oxford Stage Company; The Decameron at The Gate, London; The Terrible Voice of Satan at the Royal Court Theatre, London; The Playboy of the Western World for the Royal Exchange, Manchester; The Wind in the Willows and The Servant of Two Masters at the Crucible Theatre, Sheffield; The Party's Over at the Royal Theatre, Northampton; Dancing at Lughnasa at The Lyric, Belfast; The Playboy of the Western World at the Ambassador Theatre, Dublin; Orestes and The Clearing (winning her the TMA Award for Best Actress in a Supporting Role) for Shared Experience.

Television
Television appearances include: Doctors, Heartbeat, Casualty, The Amazing Mrs Pritchard, Murder Prevention, Peak Practice, Father Ted, The Bill, Resort to Murder and Life After Birth & Unforgotten.

Film
In film, she appeared in Molly's Way (for which she won the Best Actress awards at: Cinéma Tout Ecran, Geneva; Ourense Film Festival, Spain; Valdivia International Film Festival, Chile; and the Bogotá Film Festival, Colombia), Sundays, Why Not and Velvet Goldmine.

In 2014, she appeared as a barmaid in the film Edge of Tomorrow, starring Tom Cruise and Emily Blunt.

Radio
Her radio work includes: The Archers, Japanese Gothic Tales, Feelings Under Siege and Evelina.

References

Irish stage actresses
Irish film actresses
Irish television actresses
Living people
1970 births
Alumni of RADA